11:11 is the third studio album by Mexican guitar duo Rodrigo y Gabriela. It was released on independent label Rubyworks around the world from 2 to 8 September 2009. It guest stars Strunz & Farah on the song "Master Maqui" and Alex Skolnick on the song "Atman". The song "Buster Voodoo" was performed by the band on The Tonight Show hosted by Conan O'Brien on Thursday, 1 October 2009 and on The Late Late Show with Craig Ferguson on Wednesday, 28 October 2009. Each song on the album is a tribute to an artist that has inspired both Rodrigo and Gabriela.

The song "Santo Domingo" was chosen as the Starbucks iTunes Pick of the Week for 10 November 2009.

Track listing

Personnel
Rodrigo y Gabriela
Rodrigo Sánchez – acoustic guitar, ukulele, oud, cajón
Gabriela Quintero – acoustic guitar, ukulele, oud, darbuka

Additional performers
Jorge Strunz – acoustic guitar solo (right channel) on "Master Maqui"
Ardeshir Farah – acoustic guitar solo (left channel) on "Master Maqui"
Alex Skolnick – electric guitar solo on "Atman"
Edgardo Pineda Sanchez – piano on "11:11"

Production
Produced by Rodrigo Sánchez, except "11:11", produced by John Leckie and Rodrigo y Gabriela
Mixed by Colin Richardson
Mix engineer – Matt Hyde
Recording engineer and production assistant – Fermin Vazquez Llera
Additional engineering by Brian Wilson at Musikbox, and Martyn "Ginge" Ford and Jeff Rose at Nott-In-Pill Studios, Newport, UK
Mix coordination by Lora Richardson
Mastered by Robyn Robins

Charts

References

Rodrigo y Gabriela albums
2009 albums
Rubyworks Records albums
Albums produced by John Leckie